Abel Lobaton (born 23 November 1977 in Peru) is a Peruvian retired footballer.

References

Peruvian footballers
Living people
Association football forwards
1977 births
Peru international footballers
Peruvian expatriate footballers
Expatriate footballers in Brazil
Expatriate footballers in Portugal
Expatriate footballers in Ecuador
Expatriate footballers in Cyprus
Sport Boys footballers
Club Athletico Paranaense players
Club Universitario de Deportes footballers
Juan Aurich footballers
Cienciano footballers
Club Deportivo Universidad César Vallejo footballers
C.S. Marítimo players
S.D. Aucas footballers
Nea Salamis Famagusta FC players
FBC Melgar footballers
Universidad Técnica de Cajamarca footballers
Ayacucho FC footballers